Philip Herbert, 5th Earl of Pembroke, 2nd Earl of Montgomery (1621 – 11 December 1669), was an English nobleman and politician. He was the son of Philip Herbert, 4th Earl of Pembroke, and his first wife Susan de Vere. He succeeded his father in 1649.

In 1639, he married Penelope Naunton, widow of Paul Bayning, 2nd Viscount Bayning, and daughter of Sir Robert Naunton by his second wife, Penelope Perrot, widow of the astronomer Sir William Lower, and daughter of Sir Thomas Perrot and Dorothy Devereux. They had one child, William, who succeeded his father as 6th Earl. In 1649, after the death of his first wife, he married Catherine Villiers, daughter of Sir William Villiers, 1st Baronet. They had one daughter and two sons, Philip and Thomas. Both sons later succeeded to their father's titles. Their daughter, Susan, married John Poulett, 3rd Baron Poulett. The younger Philip became notorious as "the infamous Earl", due to his frequent bouts of homicidal mania, during which he committed several murders.

He was MP for Wiltshire in 1640 and Glamorgan in 1640–1649.

Notes

References

Surveys of the Manors of Philip, earl of Pembroke and Montgomery, 1631-2, ed. E. Kerridge (Wiltshire Record Society vol. 10, 1953)

|-

1621 births
1669 deaths
Herbert family
Chancellors of the University of Oxford
5
Philip
Lord-Lieutenants of Somerset
Members of the Parliament of England (pre-1707) for constituencies in Wales
English MPs 1640 (April)
English MPs 1640–1648
Members of the Parliament of England (pre-1707) for Wiltshire